Glazier is a surname. Notable people with the surname include:
 Alan Glazier (born 1939), retired English darts player
 Kenneth MacLean Glazier, Sr. (1912–1989), Canadian minister and librarian
 Rick Glazier (21st century), Democratic member of the North Carolina General Assembly
 Teresa Ferster Glazier (1907–2004), American nonfiction writer

See also
Glasier, surname
Glazer, surname

Occupational surnames
English-language occupational surnames